Jeffrey Scott Nielsen (born December 18, 1958) is a retired Major League Baseball pitcher. He played during one season at the major league level for the New York Yankees and Chicago White Sox. He was drafted by the Seattle Mariners in the 6th round of the 1983 amateur draft. Nielsen, played his first professional season with their Class A (Short Season) Bellingham Mariners in 1983, and his last season with the New York Mets' Triple-A club, the Tidewater Tides, in 1990.

Nielsen was a college baseball player at Brigham Young University.

References

External links

1958 births
Living people
Major League Baseball pitchers
New York Yankees players
Chicago White Sox players
Nashville Sounds players
Hawaii Islanders players
Fort Lauderdale Yankees players
Chattanooga Lookouts players
Bellingham Mariners players
Tidewater Tides players
Columbus Clippers players
Albany-Colonie Yankees players
BYU Cougars baseball players
Baseball players from Utah
Anchorage Glacier Pilots players